Vila Nova (Portuguese for "new town") may refer to:

Places

Brazil
Vila Nova, Rio Grande do Sul, a neighbourhood in Porto Alegre
Vila Nova, Santa Catarina, a neighbourhood in Joinville

Mozambique
Vila Nova de Fronteira, a locality in the district of Mutarara, province of Tete

Portugal

Municipalities
Vila Nova da Barquinha, a municipality in the district of Santarém
Vila Nova de Cerveira, a municipality in the district of Viana do Castelo
Vila Nova de Famalicão, a municipality in the district of Braga
Vila Nova de Foz Côa, a municipality in the district of Guarda
Vila Nova de Gaia, a municipality in the district of Porto
Vila Nova de Paiva, a municipality in the district of Viseu
Vila Nova de Poiares, a municipality in the district of Coimbra

Parishes
Vila Nova (Miranda do Corvo), a parish in the municipality of Miranda do Corvo
Vila Nova (Praia da Vitória), a parish in the municipality of Praia da Vitória, Azores
Vila Nova da Barca, a parish in the municipality of Montemor-o-Velho
Vila Nova da Baronia, a parish in the municipality of Alvito
Vila Nova da Muía, a parish in the municipality of Ponte da Barca 
Vila Nova da Rainha (Azambuja), a parish in the municipality of Azambuja
Vila Nova da Rainha (Tondela), a parish in the municipality of Tondela 
Vila Nova da Telha, a parish in the municipality of Maia
Vila Nova de Anços, a parish in the municipality of Soure
Vila Nova de Cacela, a parish in the municipality of Vila Real de Santo António
Vila Nova de Milfontes, a parish in the municipality of Odemira
Vila Nova de Monsarros, a parish in the municipality of Anadia
Vila Nova de Oliveirinha, a parish in the municipality of Tábua
Vila Nova de São Pedro, a parish in the municipality of Azambuja
Vila Nova de Souto d'El-Rei, a parish in the municipality of Lamego 
Vila Nova de Tazem, a parish in the municipality of Gouveia
Vila Nova do Ceira, a parish in the municipality of Góis

Other uses
Vila Nova Futebol Clube, a Brazilian football club

See also
 Villa Nova (disambiguation)
 Vilanova (disambiguation)
 Villanova (disambiguation)